JTCC may refer to:

Japanese Touring Car Championship
Junior Tennis Champions Center - tennis training center in College Park, Maryland
John Tyler Community College
Journal of Theoretical and Computational Chemistry